Gianluca Buonanno (15 May 1966 – 5 June 2016) was an Italian politician born in Borgosesia. At the time of his death, Buonanno was mayor of Borgosesia, member of Lega Nord and MEP.

Biography
He was affiliated with the Italian Social Movement from 1982 to 1995, when he switched to the National Alliance. Buonanno left the National Alliance for Lega Nord in 2002. He was elected in the XVI and XVII legislature of Italy and in the 2014 European Parliament election for the eighth European Parliament. As an MEP, Buonanno was an unaffiliated Non-Inscrit before joining Europe of Nations and Freedom, and was backed by the European Alliance for Freedom and Movement for a Europe of Nations and Freedom.

Buonanno died at the age of 50 in 2016 in a car accident in Gorla Maggiore, province of Varese. His funeral was held in the parish church of Serravalle Sesia, where Lega Nord leader, Matteo Salvini, was also present.

Political views and controversies
Buonanno was known for having shown attitudes typical of the Italian far-right politics and generating controversy and public uproar.

Multiple times he expressed opinions, judged to be homophobic, on homosexuality. In 2011 Buonanno said: "Gays, everything is due to them. When a homosexual happens to be beaten up, a great outcry comes out, but nobody says anything when who is beaten up is not gay". In 2013 he then claimed: "At Gay Pride you can see scenes that are disgusting, horrifying scenes. Pride sucks. If a gay person approaches me, does some flirting and he pisses me off, I kick him in the balls". In April 2014, Buonanno had waved a sea bass in parliament arguing that pensioners cannot afford it, unlike immigrants, who are kept in luxury hotels and inviting the then President of the Chamber of Deputies Laura Boldrini to eat it.

During September 2014 Buonanno declared: "In Borgosesia there may be a dozen of gay people, but they may have increased. I would prefer to register and identify them all. If they ask me to celebrate a gay wedding in the town where I'm mayor, I'd say it's better for them to get an involuntary treatment. At most I would offer to gays, bananas or fennel salad".

In 2015 Buonanno also sided against the Romani people, saying: "Romanis are the scum of society". Because of this, in April 2016, the "Court of Milan" upheld an appeal filed by the "A.S.G.I." (Association of legal studies on immigration) and "N.A.G.A." (Voluntary association of social-health assistance and for the rights of foreign citizens, Romani and Sinti) associations and sentenced Buonanno to the payment of €6000 in favor of each of the recurring associations as compensation for non-pecuniary damage.

Notes

References

1966 births
2016 deaths
20th-century Italian politicians
21st-century Italian politicians
Europe of Nations and Freedom MEPs
Italian Social Movement politicians
Lega Nord MEPs
Members of the Chamber of Deputies (Italy)
MEPs for Italy 2014–2019
National Alliance (Italy) politicians
People from Borgosesia
Road incident deaths in Italy
Far-right politics in Italy